Cayo or cayó may refer to:

 Cayo (film), a 2005 Puerto Rican film starring Roselyn Sánchez
 Cayo District, a district in the west of the nation of Belize
 San Ignacio, Belize, a town in the Cayo District (originally named "El Cayo")
 Caio, Carmarthenshire, a village in Wales sometimes spelt with a 'y'
 Cayo Hundred, a geographic division named after the village
 "Cayó", a 2022 song by Arca

See also 
 Caio (disambiguation)
 Cay (sand island)